The Hill and Dale Preserve is an approximately  nature reserve located in Lebanon, New Jersey.  The preserve is primarily a combination of open fields and wooded sections. Higher elevations provide scenic views of the Watchung Mountains, Round Valley Reservoir and Cushetunk Mountain.  A portion of Rockaway Creek and its tributaries run through the preserve.

The park is physically connected to adjacent Hell Mountain Preserve.

Development rights to 100 acres of the preserve have been purchased to ensure that no development can occur, but this land still remains in private hands. These 100 acres have been permanently limited to agricultural use.

The preserve is managed by New Jersey Conservation Foundation.

History 
The preserve was first opened in 2011 with an initial land purchase of 115 acres  Subsequent land purchases have extended the preserve to the current 292 acres.  Hill & Dale farm has existed first as a dairy farm and later as a horse farm   The land was acquired through a combination of multiple public and private funding sources.

Location 
The preserve is located in Lebanon NJ.  For driving directions go to 3 Parsonage lot Road  and look for the small (unmarked) parking lot by Hell Mountain Preserve.   This lot is just across the street from Hill & Dale.   GPS 40°41'00.6"N 74°46'55.5"W takes you to the parking lot.

Recreation 

 Hiking
 Horseback Riding 
 Bird watching
 Photography

Points of interest 

 Scenic Views of surrounding countryside and mountains 
 Historic Dutch style barns, fields and pastures 
 Rockaway Creek

Hiking 
The preserve has ~2.3 miles of marked trails: red/orange*1.2 miles, blue 1.0 mile and purple ~800 ft.  The preserve begins in the Rockaway Creek Valley and includes some steep climbs. Overall difficulty is moderate. The trails skirt portions of active farmland within the preserve. 

*Trail map says the trail blazes are red though they are shown as orange on the map and in the field

Trail map:

References 

Parks in Hunterdon County, New Jersey